Girl and the Sea is the second EP by Australian electronic dance music duo The Presets released on Modular Records on 1 November 2004. The EP reached No. 6 on the AIR charts and at No. 20 on the ARIA Hitseekers Charts. The vocals for the song were sung by Julian Hamilton and recorded by The Presets in Kim Moyes' small apartment bathroom. The song was included on the duo's debut studio album Beams, and was also featured in the TV series The O.C.

Australian Music Online described the release as being "like a night in October, that perfect combination of hot and cold, light and dark, the nenish tart of EP's"..."Veering from the filthy impending dooms night atmosphere and blippy electronics of "Kitty in the Middle" to the title track "Girl and the Sea"'s wandering bass and pristine, travelling Euro feel, the storming, ecstatic "Summer O' Love" and the gorgeous, heavenly melancholy of "Mia's Mouse".

Track listing

Release history

Notes

The Presets songs
2004 singles
Songs written by Samuel Dixon
Songs written by Julian Hamilton
Songs written by Kim Moyes
2004 songs